The track speed skating events of World Games I were held on July 29–31, 1981, in Parking Lot J of Marriott’s Great America amusement park in Santa Clara, California, in the United States. These were the first World Games, an international quadrennial multi-sport event, and were hosted by the city of Santa Clara. The course was a 400-meter triangle-shaped track.  Italian athletes won 11 of the 18 track speed skating medals.

Medalists
Sources:

Details

Men

5000 m

Tom Peterson, USA, 10:29.58.
Giuseppe Cruciani, Italy, 10:29.73.
Hermes Fossi, Italy, 10:30.42.
Dimitri Van Cauwemberge, Belgium, 10:31.11.
Chuck Jackson, USA, 10:31.20.
Danny Van De Perre, Belgium, 10:31.22.
Robb Dunn, USA, 10:32.10.
Scott Constantine, New Zealand, 10:32.24.
Augustin Ramirez, Colombia, 10:32.37.
Dean Huffman, USA, 10:33.31.
Alvaro Arrendondo, Colombia, 10:34.06.
Humberto Triana, Colombia, 10:34.34.
Serge Plante, Canada, 10:38.04.
Roland De Roo, Belgium, 10:41.69.
Moreno Bagnolini, Italy, 10:51.69.
Doug Blair, Canada, 10:56.24.

10,000 m

Tom Peterson, USA, 20:19.19
Hermes Fossi, Italy, 20:19.35
Moreno Bagnolini, Italy, 20:19.41
Danny Van de Perre, Belgium, 20:19.41
Chuck Jackson, USA, 20:19.67
Robb Dunn, USA, 20:19.81
Scott Constantine, New Zealand, 20:19.87
Humberto Triana, Colombia, 20:20.01
Dean Huffman, USA 20:20.09
Augustin Ramirez, Colombia, 20:20.64
Alvaro Arrendondo, Colombia, 20:20.70
Dimitri Van Cauwenberghe, Belgium, 20:20.75
Serge Plante, Canada, 20:20.97
Roland De Rod, Belgium, 20:21.00
Giuseppe Cruciani, Italy, 20:27.09
Doug Blair, Canada, 20:49.68

20,000 m

Scott Constantine, New Zealand, 40:03.43.
Giuseppe Cruciani, Italy, 40:38.02.
Moreno Bagnolini, Italy, 40:38.06.
Danny Van De Perre, Belgium, 40:38.08.
Tom Peterson, USA, disqualified from 3rd, no time credited
Hermes Fossi, Italy, 40:39.02.
Augustin Ramirez, Colombia, 40:39.04.
 (tie) Robb Dunn, USA; Dimitri Van Cauwenberghe, Belgium; Serge Plante, Canada, 40:39.08.

Women

5000 m

Monica Lucchese, Italy, 10:18.90.
Paola Sometti, Italy, 10:19.01.
Annie Lambrechts, Belgium, 10:19.53.
Mary Barriere, USA, 10:19.80.
Paola Christofori, Italy, 10:20.49.
Sue Dooley, USA, 10:24.79.
Fiona Wass, New Zealand, 10:25.53.
Darlene Kessinger, USA, 10:31.03.
Christine DeClerk, Belgium, 10:34.59.

10,000 m

Paola Cristofori, Italy, 21:45.13
Darlene Kessinger, USA, 21:45.25
Anne Lambrechts, Belgium, 21:45.84
Mary Barriere, USA, 21:46.14
Paola Sometti, Italy, 21:46.17
Monica Lucchese, Italy, 212:46.45
Luigia Foini, Italy, 21:46.60
Fiona Wass, New Zealand, 21:47.36
Sue Dooley, USA, 21:47.68
Christine DeClerck, Belgium, 21:48.00
Marie Van Damme, Belgium, DNF

15,000 m

Annie Lambrechte, Belgium, 33:45.04. (time as published in source)
Paola Christofori, Italy, 33:45.03.
Monica Lucchese, Italy, 33:45.03.
Darlene Kessinger, USA, 33:45.04.
Paola Sometti, Italy, 33:46.02.

No times –

See also

References

Roller sports at multi-sport events
1981 in roller sports
1981 World Games